German submarine U-751 was a Type VIIC U-boat built for Nazi Germany's Kriegsmarine for service during World War II. Built as yard number 134 of the Kriegsmarinewerft shipyard in Wilhelmshaven, she was commissioned on 31 January 1941. She served with 7th U-boat Flotilla until 1 June as a training boat, and as an operational boat until 17 July 1942, under the command of Kapitänleutnant Gerhard Bigalk. U-751 served in seven patrols with the 7th U-boat Flotilla, sinking the escort carrier . The U-boat was attacked with depth charges from aircraft on 17 July 1942 and sank with the loss of all 48 crew members.

Design
German Type VIIC submarines were preceded by the shorter Type VIIB submarines. U-751 had a displacement of  when at the surface and  while submerged. She had two shafts and two  propellers.

U-751 was fitted with five  torpedo tubes (four fitted at the bow and one at the stern), fourteen torpedoes, one  SK C/35 naval gun, 220 rounds, and a  C/30 anti-aircraft gun. The boat had a complement of between forty-four and sixty.

Service history

On 14 June 1941, eleven days into her thirty-three-day first patrol while en route from Kiel to St. Nazaire, U-751 attacked and sank the British ship St Lindsay.

Arriving at St. Nazaire on 5 July, U-751 stayed in port for thirty-four days before going on her second patrol. She attacked no ships on her second and third voyages.

Five days into her fourth patrol, on 21 December 1941, U-751 attacked and sank , an escort carrier attached with British convoy HG 76.

On 14 January 1942, U-751 left St. Nazaire on her fifth patrol, destined to return on 23 February. Nineteen days into this patrol, on February 2, U-751 attacked and damaged the Dutch ship Corilla, part of convoy HX 173. Two days later, she sank the British ship Silveray, adding another  to her score. The American ships Nicarao and Isabela were sunk in her sixth patrol, on 16 and 19 May 1942, totalling 1,455 and s respectively.

Wolfpacks
U-751 took part in six wolfpacks, namely:
 West (16 – 20 June 1941)
 Hammer (5 – 12 August 1941)
 Grönland (12 – 27 August 1941)
 Bosemüller (28 August – 2 September 1941)
 Seewolf (2 – 5 September 1941)
 Reissewolf (21 – 31 October 1941)

Fate
After serving six operational patrols, U-751 was attacked on her seventh patrol four days into her voyage on July 17 1942. She was sunk, with all hands lost, off the coast of Cape Ortegal, Spain by depth charges from a Lancaster bomber (of No. 61 Squadron RAF) and a Whitley bomber (of No. 502 Squadron RAF).

Summary of raiding history

References

Notes

Citations

Bibliography

External links

1940 ships
U-boats commissioned in 1941
World War II submarines of Germany
Ships built in Wilhelmshaven
U-boats sunk in 1942
World War II shipwrecks in the Atlantic Ocean
Shipwrecks of Spain
U-boats sunk by British aircraft
U-boats sunk by depth charges
German Type VIIC submarines
Ships lost with all hands
Maritime incidents in July 1942